Leptophis nebulosus, commonly known as Oliver's parrot snake, is a species of arboreal snake of the family Colubridae. It is found in Central America (Panama, Costa Rica, Nicaragua, Honduras).

Leptophis nebulosus occurs in moist, wet and rainforests where it lives arboreally in the understory vegetation. It is diurnal and preys on lizards and sleeping frogs. It is oviparous.

References

Colubrids
Snakes of Central America
Reptiles of Costa Rica
Reptiles of Honduras
Reptiles of Nicaragua
Reptiles of Panama
Reptiles described in 1942